The Sesvenna Alps are a mountain range located in the Alps of eastern Switzerland, northern Italy and western Austria.

Geography
Sesvenna Alps are considered to be part of the Central Eastern Alps. Their high dolomitic peaks overlook Scuol in the lower Engadine Valley, warranting them the name Engadine Dolomites.

The Sesvenna Alps are separated from the Samnaun, Silvretta and Albula Alps in the north-west by the Engadine Valley; from the Livigno Alps in the south-west by the Spöl valley; from the Ortler Alps in the south-south-west by the Ofen Pass and Val Müstair; from the Ötztal Alps in the east by the upper Adige valley and the Reschen Pass. The range is drained by the rivers Inn (the Engadine) and Adige.

The highest peak is Piz Sesvenna, closely followed by the high peaks overlooking Scuol: Piz Pisoc, Piz Plavna Dadaint and Piz Lischana.

Peaks
The main peaks of the Sesvenna Alps are:

Passes
The main passes of the Sesvenna Alps are:

Gallery

See also
Swiss Alps

References

Swisstopo topographic maps (1:25,000)

Mountain ranges of the Alps
Rhaetian Alps
Mountain ranges of Switzerland
Mountain ranges of Italy
Mountain ranges of Graubünden
Mountain ranges of Tyrol (state)